The 1985–86 snooker season was a series of snooker tournaments played between July 1985 and May 1986. The following table outlines the results for ranking events and the invitational events.


Calendar

Official rankings 

The top 16 of the world rankings, these players automatically played in the final rounds of the world ranking events and were invited for the Masters.

Notes

References

External links 
 

1985
Season 1986
Season 1985